Mikhail Elgin and Denis Istomin were the defending champions, but Istomin chose not to participate this year. Elgin played alongside Sergey Betov and lost in the first round to Sam Groth and Chris Guccione.
František Čermák and Jiří Veselý won the title, defeating Sam Groth and Chris Guccione in the final, 7–6(7–2), 7–5.

Seeds

Draw

Draw

References
 Main Draw

2014 Men's Doubles
Kremlin Cup - Doubles